Andrey Sergeyevich Moiseyev (born June 3, 1979) is a Russian pentathlete, who won the gold medal in the modern pentathlon at the 2004 Summer Olympics and 2008 Summer Olympics. His 2004 score of 5480 is broken down as follows:

 Shooting — 1036
 Fencing — 1000
 Swimming — 1376
 Riding — 1032
 Running — 1036

References 
 
 

1979 births
Living people
Russian male modern pentathletes
Olympic modern pentathletes of Russia
Olympic gold medalists for Russia
Modern pentathletes at the 2004 Summer Olympics
Modern pentathletes at the 2008 Summer Olympics
Modern pentathletes at the 2012 Summer Olympics
Sportspeople from Rostov-on-Don
Olympic medalists in modern pentathlon
Medalists at the 2008 Summer Olympics
Medalists at the 2004 Summer Olympics